Backup is a British television police procedural crime drama series, devised by Nigel McCrery and Roy Mitchell, that ran for a total of fourteen episodes across two series on BBC One between September 7, 1995 and July 2, 1997. Focusing on the work of a police Operational Support Unit, similar to the Territorial Support Group, the series follows the operations of the nine officers of Charlie Van, an OSU of the West Midlands Police.

Both series were filmed at Pebble Mill Studios, and saw the likes of Martin Troakes, Christopher John Hall and Nick Miles among the main cast. A then-unknown Matthew Rhys starred in the second series as PC Steve 'Hiccup' Higson, his first televisual role. Initial press releases for the series stated, "When things get too much for the officers on the front line, they call for Backup, the Operational Support Unit (OSU)."

Notably, the series has never been released on DVD, and aside from a single repeat run on UK Gold in the late 1990s, has yet to be further repeated on British television.

Cast
 Martin Troakes as Sgt. Bill 'Sarge' Parkin 
 Christopher John Hall as PC Eric 'Token' Warren 
 Nick Miles as PC John 'Thug' Barrett 
 Katrina Levon as PC Gill 'Dippy' Copson 
 Calum MacPherson as PC Roger 'Flub' Tennant 
 William Tapley as PC Lionel 'Oz' Adams 
 Christopher Quinn as PC Richard Goole
 Adam Morris as Inspector 'Jean' Harlow 
 Peter Sullivan as DI Ken Overton

Series 1 (1995)
 Alex Norton as PC Iain 'Jock' MacRae 
 Colette Koo as PC Susan 'Bruce' Li 
 Oliver Milburn as PC Wayne 'Bog' Cheetham 
 Suzan Crowley as DCI Helen Chivers 
 Sam Cox as Superintendent Alec Hallsworth

Series 2 (1997)
 James Gaddas as PC Jim 'Grim' Reaper 
 Matthew Rhys as PC Steve 'Hiccup' Higson 
 Kate Gartside as DS Kath Reaper

Episodes

Series 1 (1995)

Series 2 (1997)

References

External links
 

1990s British drama television series
1995 British television series debuts
1997 British television series endings
1990s British crime television series
BBC television dramas
English-language television shows